= NBA Hotshot =

2010 video game

- Developer(s): Freeverse Inc.
- Publisher(s): Freeverse Inc.
- Platform(s): iOS
- Release: iPhone; January 5, 2010 iPad; April 1, 2010
- Genre(s): Sports
- Mode(s): Single-player, multiplayer

NBA Hotshot is a basketball video game developed and published by Freeverse Inc. for iPhone and iPad in 2010.

== Reception ==
Reception

Aggregate score
Aggregator	Score
Metacritic	68/100

Review scores
Publication	Score
Eurogamer	7/10
Macworld	(iPhone) (iPad)
Pocket Gamer	4/5 stars
TouchArcade	3/5 stars

The iPhone version received "average" reviews according to the review aggregation website Metacritic.
